Pluta, Pliuta or Plyuta is a surname. Notable people include:

 Andrzej Pluta (born 1974), Polish basketball player and coach
 Grzegorz Pluta (born 1974), Polish wheelchair fencer
 Yevhen Plyuta (born 1974), Ukrainian figure skater

See also
 

Polish-language surnames
Ukrainian-language surnames